Ashleigh Barty defeated Markéta Vondroušová in the final, 6–1, 6–3 to win the women's singles tennis title at the 2019 French Open. It was her first major singles title, making her the first Australian to win a French Open singles title since Margaret Court in 1973 and the first to win any major singles title since Samantha Stosur at the 2011 US Open.

Simona Halep was the defending champion, but lost to Amanda Anisimova in the quarterfinals. Anisimova became the first tennis player born in the 21st century to reach the quarterfinals and semifinals of a major.

Naomi Osaka retained the WTA no. 1 singles ranking after Karolína Plíšková lost in the third round. Angelique Kerber, Kiki Bertens and Petra Kvitová were also in contention for the top ranking. Osaka's streak of 16 consecutive wins at the major level was broken when she lost to Kateřina Siniaková in the third round.

For the first time since the 1978 Australian Open, none of the four semifinalists had previously reached a major singles final. Of the four, Johanna Konta was the only one who had previously reached a semifinal. Of Konta's seven appearances in the main draw of the French Open, this is the only edition where she progressed beyond the first round.

This marked the final major main draw appearance of former world No. 4 and 2016 WTA Finals champion Dominika Cibulková; she was defeated by Aryna Sabalenka in the first round. It was also the first French Open main draw appearance of future world No. 1 and two-time champion Iga Świątek, who reached the fourth round and was defeated by Halep. It was also the first major appearance of future Wimbledon champion Elena Rybakina, who entered the main draw as a qualifier and lost to Kateřina Siniaková in the first round.

Seeds
Seeding per WTA rankings.

Qualifying

Draw

Finals

Top half

Section 1

Section 2

Section 3

Section 4

Bottom half

Section 5

Section 6

Section 7

Section 8

Championship match ratings
1.030 million on NBC, in the USA

Championship match statistics

References

External links
 Main Draw
2019 French Open – Women's draws and results at the International Tennis Federation

Women's Singles
French Open by year – Women's singles
French Open - Women's Singles